Tannurin is a village in Syria in the Talkalakh District, Homs Governorate. It is situated in the area known as Wadi al-Nasara ('valley of the Christians'). According to the Syria Central Bureau of Statistics, Tannurin had a population of 484 in the 2004 census. Its inhabitants are predominantly Greek Orthodox and Greek Catholic Christians. The village has a Greek Orthodox church and a Greek Catholic church.

References

Populated places in Talkalakh District
Eastern Orthodox Christian communities in Syria
Christian communities in Syria